Mouth to Mouth is the third studio album by The Blackeyed Susans, released in July, 1995.

Reception
Rolling Stone Australia described the album as, "Dramatic songs of unhealthy obsession wrapped in lush cinematic arrangements, Mouth to Mouth (as in kissing and/or emergency resuscitation) refined the Blackeyed Susans' unique balance of romantic and sinister. A darkly beautiful exploration of passion for the slightly deranged."

Track listing 
 "As It Was" (Phil Kakulas) – 4:32
 "She Breathes In (She Breathes Out)" (Phil Kakulas, Rob Snarski) – 5:07
 "Let’s Live" (Phil Kakulas, Rob Snarski) – 4:05
 "Hey Buddy" (Phil Kakulas) – 4:23
 "By Your Hand" (David McComb, Rob Snarski) – 2:33
 "I Can’t Find Your Pulse" (Rob Snarski, Phil Kakulas) – 6:25
 "Mouth to Mouth" (Phil Kakulas, Rob Snarski) – 4:22
 "Mary Mac" (Phil Kakulas) – 3:41
 "The Shadow of Her Smile" (Phil Kakulas, Rob Snarski) – 4:13
 "I Need You" (Rob Snarski) – 3:50
 "The End of the Line" (Phil Kakulas, Rob Snarski, Will Akers) – 5:05

Personnel 
 Rob Snarski – vocals, electric and acoustic guitars, percussion, tremolo guitar, backing vocals, zobeno, mb bottle, e-bow
 Phil Kakulas – double bass, electric bass, percussion, toon tube, vocals, brigade drum, tambourine, guitar, fuzz bass, vb bottle
 Kiernan Box – piano, organ, harmonica, Wurlitzer piano, bass pedals, vibes
 Graham Lee – pedal steel, lap steel, electric guitars, acoustic guitars, backing vocals
 Mark C Halstead – backing vocals
 Ashley Davies – drum kit
 Dan Luscombe – lead guitar, tremolo guitar, fuzz guitar
 Nick Elliott – tambourine, saxophone,
 Jen Anderson – violins
 Helen Mountfort – cello
 Katherine Wemyss – trumpet, backing vocals
 Chris Boyce – trombone
 Sarah Liversidge – backing vocals
 Richard Nixon - electric triangle

References

The Blackeyed Susans albums
1995 albums
Albums produced by Victor Van Vugt
Albums produced by Tony Cohen